32 Andromedae, abbreviated 32 And, is a star in the northern constellation of Andromeda. 32 Andromedae is the Flamsteed designation. It is faintly visible to the naked eye with an apparent visual magnitude is 5.30. It is moving closer to the Earth with a heliocentric radial velocity of −5 km/s.

With an age of 420 million years, this is a red giant star with a stellar classification of G8 III, indicating it has consumed the hydrogen at its core and evolved off the main sequence. It has 2.8 times the mass of the Sun and has expanded to 12 times the Sun's radius. The star is radiating 90 times the Sun's luminosity from its enlarged photosphere at an effective temperature of 5,107 K.

References

External links
 Image 26 Andromedae

G-type giants
Andromeda (constellation)
Durchmusterung objects
Andromedae, 32
003817
003231
0175